Obninsk is a city in Kaluga Oblast, Russia, located on the bank of the Protva River  southwest of Moscow and  northeast of Kaluga. Population:

History
The history of Obninsk began in 1945 when the First Research Institute Laboratory "V", which later became known as IPPE (Institute of Physics and Power Engineering) was founded. On June 27, 1954, Obninsk started operations of the world's first nuclear power plant to generate electricity for a power grid. The city was built next to the plant in order to support it. Scientists, engineers, construction workers, teachers and other professionals moved to Obninsk from all over the Soviet Union. Town status was granted to Obninsk on June 24, 1956. The name of the city is taken from Obninskoye, the train station in Moscow-Bryansk railroad, built in Tsarist times. Obninskoye and Obninsk were the frontline edges of the White/Red Armies in 1917-1924, also the 1812 War with France and the 1941-1942 Battle of Moscow Campaigns in World War II.

Administrative and municipal status
Within the framework of administrative divisions, it is incorporated as the City of Obninsk — an administrative unit with the status equal to that of the districts. As a municipal division, the City of Obninsk is incorporated as Obninsk Urban Okrug.

Demographics
According to the 2021 Census, the population of the city was  According to the previous, 2010 Census, the population of the city was 104,739, down from 105,706 recorded in the 2002 Census, but up from 100,178 recorded in the 1989 Census.

The average age of the citizens is thirty-nine years.

Transportation
The city is located on the main rail line between Moscow and Kyiv and at the intersection of Kiev and Warsaw highways. Three international airports are within reach from Obninsk: Vnukovo (70 km), Domodedovo (100 km), and Sheremetyevo (130 km).

Science and education

Obninsk is one of the major Russian science cities. In 2000, it was awarded the status of the First Science City of Russia. The city is home to twelve scientific research institutes. Their main activities are nuclear power engineering, nuclear methods and radiation technology, technology of non-metallic materials, medical radiology, meteorology and ecology and environmental protection.

The first nuclear power plant in the world for the large-scale production of electricity opened here on June 27, 1954, and it also doubled as a training base for the crew of the Soviet Union's first nuclear submarine, the K-3 Leninsky Komsomol.

Obninsk is famous for its meteorological tower which was built to study spreading of radiation from the nuclear station.

The following institutes are located in the city:
State Scientific Center of Russian Federation Institute for Physics and Power Engineering
State Scientific Center of Russian Federation Obninsk Scientific Production Enterprise "Tekhnologiya"
Medical Radiological Research Center of the Russian Academy of Medical Sciences
Obninsk Branch of the State Scientific Center of the Russian Federation "Karpov Institute of Physical Chemistry"
Obninsk Institute for Nuclear Power Engineering
Russian Research Institute of Hydrometeorological Information (World Data Center)
Central Pilot Expedition of the Geophysical Service of the Russian Academy of Sciences
Russian Research Institute of Agricultural Radiology and Agroecology
Central Design Bureau of Hydrometeorological Instrumentation
Russian Research Institute of Agricultural Meteorology
Scientific Production Association TYPHOON

Economy
Situated in Obninsk are the plants of companies such as Kraftway (the largest manufacturer of personal computers in Russia), Rautaruukki, Lotte Confectionery, Hemofarm a.d.

Government
The head of the city administration is Tatyana Leonova.

Sport
There is a bandy club called Atom.

Twin towns – sister cities

Obninsk is twinned with:

 Astravyets, Belarus
 Belene, Bulgaria
 Frascati, Italy

 Mianyang, China
 Montpellier, France
 Oak Ridge, United States
 Visaginas, Lithuania

References

Notes

Sources

External links
Official website of Obninsk 

Cities and towns in Kaluga Oblast
Cities and towns built in the Soviet Union
Naukograds